North High School, or Evansville North High School, is a public high school now located on the north side of Vanderburgh County, Indiana, approximately 9.5 miles north of Evansville, Indiana, United States.

History
In the early 1950s the Evansville and Vanderburgh County population was increasing and pushing in a northern direction. It was decided that a new high school was needed to relieve the burden on the existing public high schools (Central High School in its original location, FJ Reitz High School and Benjamin Bosse High School).

The location of the school on property near the Mechanic Arts Trades and Industry High School on the north side was chosen. Mechanic Arts' curriculum (and its building) was incorporated into the new high school, which would allow students from the other high schools to come as shared time students.

In fall 1956, the new North High School opened, serving students from the seventh through 12th grades (the two lowest grades were removed shortly afterward). The first graduating class consisted of only 18 girls and 149 boys because students in the district were allowed to choose to remain at their present high school or to transfer to the new school. After the city/county merger in 1958, this district included Vogel, Delaware, Scott, Evans, and Oak Hill Schools, as well as some students from Howard Roosa and Stringtown Schools. This huge district stayed relatively stable through desegregation and a middle school reorganization. The high school, located on Diamond Avenue on the northern side of the city, was almost closed due to low enrollment in 1983. Since the community's successful effort to save the school, the northeastern part of the county has experienced massive population growth. A sixth feeder school was added in 2019 in McCutchanville, replacing the original McCutchanville School that was consolidated into Oak Hill School in 1965.

On November 4, 2008, Vanderburgh County voters approved a $149 million bond issue for the EVSC. A long list of projects included a new $58.2 million high school for 2,000 students and an adjacent $27 million junior high school for 1,000 students. In late November 2008, the EVSC purchased around  near U.S. 41 and Baseline Road, nine miles north of Evansville, for the new campus. The new North High School building opened in January 2012, complete with its first football stadium.

North principals
1956 - 1967: Adrian Meadows
1967 - 1981: Harold Buck
1981 - 1999: James Sharp
1999 - 2009: Brenda Weber
2009–Present: John Skinner

School District

Elementary Schools (K-6)
Scott Elementary School
Oak Hill Elementary School
Vogel Elementary School
Evans Elementary School
Delaware Elementary School
McCutchanville Elementary School

Middle Schools (7-8)
North Junior High School

Sports
Also see: Sports in Evansville

* Baseball title was won before IHSAA State Tournament was initiated.

North High School competes in the Southern Indiana Athletic Conference, which is a part of the Indiana High School Athletic Association.

Old North High School
The old North High School facility is now used as the Academy for Innovative studies Diamond Branch, though AIS only takes up a small percentage of the school. The auditorium is still  host to numerous musicals and plays, such as a 2014 production of Les Misèrables.

Notable alumni
 Chuck Bundrant, billionaire businessman, founder, chairman and majority owner of Trident Seafoods Namesake of Bundrant Stadium on the current campus.
 Deke Cooper, NFL player
 Bob Ford, ABA player and television executive
 John C. Martin, former CEO and executive chairman of the board Gilead Sciences
 Brian Merriweather, professional basketball player
 Jeff Overton, PGA Tour player
 Josh Tudela, MLS player
 Dave Schellhase, All-American basketball player, NBA player, longtime college basketball coach

References

External links
 Evansville North High School

 

High schools in Southwestern Indiana
Schools in Evansville, Indiana
Public high schools in Indiana
Southern Indiana Athletic Conference
Educational institutions established in 1956
1956 establishments in Indiana